Wing Commander is a 1999 science fiction film loosely based on the video game series of the same name. It was directed by Chris Roberts, the creator of the game series, and stars Freddie Prinze Jr., Matthew Lillard, Saffron Burrows, Tchéky Karyo, Jürgen Prochnow, David Suchet, and David Warner.

Principal photography took place in Luxembourg in 1998 and post-production was done in Austin, Texas. The film was released on March 12, 1999 to critical and commercial failure, grossing a little over $11 million. The film was the second on-screen collaboration with Lillard and Prinze Jr. after She's All That, who both later worked in the first two Scooby-Doo films and Summer Catch.

Plot
In 2654, an interstellar war rages between the Terran Confederation and the Kilrathi Empire. The cat-like Kilrathi seek the complete eradication of the human race.

A massive Kilrathi armada attacks Pegasus Station, a remote but vital Confederation base, and captures a navigation computer, through which it locates Earth. Admiral Geoffrey Tolwyn recalls the Terran fleet to defend Earth, but expects it to arrive two hours too late. Tolwyn orders Lieutenant Christopher Blair, whose father he knew from a previous conflict called the Pilgrim Wars, to carry orders to the carrier TCS Tiger Claw in the Vega Sector, under the command of Captain Jason Sansky, to fight a suicidal delaying action to buy the needed time.

Lieutenants Blair and Todd Marshall are pilots fresh out of training, traveling aboard the small supply ship Diligent, commanded by Captain James Taggart, to their new posting aboard the Tiger Claw. En route, the ship is pulled into a gravity well and loses its navigation computer. While Taggart repairs it, Blair space-jumps them to safety, calculating the jump in under ten seconds. Taggart notes that Blair outperformed the computer.

Along with the awkwardness of joining a new unit, and continual pranks that require discipline from his wing commander Lieutenant Commander Jeanette Deveraux, Blair fights the distrust of Commander Paul Gerald and his crewmate Lieutenant Ian St. John because of the drastic orders he brings from the Admiral, and because his mother was a "Pilgrim", a strain of humans who were the cause of the Pilgrim Wars. Pilgrims were the first human explorers and colonists and had developed the innate ability to navigate space by feel despite obstacles such as black holes. Marshall finds a kindred spirit in Lieutenant Rosie Forbes and falls in love with her, but she dies when her fighter is damaged after a battle with an advance group of Kilrathi vessels and crashes on the flight deck during landing as the result of friendly competition with Marshall. The incident enrages Deveraux and shakes Marshall's confidence.

Despite several setbacks, the Tiger Claw'''s personnel successfully attack and board a Kilrathi communications ship with the Diligent. In the attack, they find the stolen navigation computer and learn the coordinates the Kilrathi fleet will use to approach Earth. The Tiger Claw, however, is heavily damaged and can do nothing more to prevent the assault, except to send Deveraux and Blair in fighters to find their way back to Earth. While it would normally be impossible for fighters to make such a jump without a navigation computer, Blair's Pilgrim heritage enables him to calculate the jump himself. If alerted to the Kilrathi's plans, Earth forces can destroy each Kilrathi ship before it gets its bearings after the space-jump; if not, Earth's defenses will surely be overwhelmed. Before Blair leaves, Taggart, who is in reality a Naval Intelligence officer, reveals himself to be a Pilgrim as well, shocking Blair.

Deveraux's fighter is disabled in combat after destroying a missile, but she convinces Blair not to rescue her but to continue his mission. Blair uses his Pilgrim sense to jump to the vicinity of Earth. As his fighter begins to run out of fuel, he transmits the information Earth needs to defeat the Kilrathi assault. He is pursued through the jump by the Kilrathi command ship, but his position lets him bait the Kilrathi into the gravity well he encountered at the start of the movie. He pulls his fighter away at the last minute but the command ship is pulled in due to its larger mass. Unprepared, the Kilrathi fleet is destroyed by the Earth fleet without a fight. A Rescue and Recovery pilot from the Earth fleet rescues Blair while Taggart rescues Deveraux in the Diligent. Blair and Deveraux are reunited on the Tiger Claw and share a kiss as Deveraux is taken to get medical attention.

Cast
 Freddie Prinze Jr. as First Lieutenant (or Lieutenant Junior Grade as he introduces himself in one scene) Christopher "Maverick" Blair
 Saffron Burrows as Lieutenant Commander Jeannette "Angel" Deveraux
 Matthew Lillard as First Lieutenant Todd "Maniac" Marshall
Tchéky Karyo as Commodore James "Paladin" Taggart (as Tcheky Karyo)
 David Suchet as Captain Jason "Jay" Sansky
 Jürgen Prochnow as Commander Paul Gerald
 David Warner as Admiral Geoffrey Tolwyn
 Ginny Holder as Lieutenant Rosie "Sister Sassy" Forbes
Hugh Quarshie as Lieutenant Obutu
 Ken Bones as Admiral Bill Wilson
 John McGlynn as Commodore Richard Bellegarde
 Richard Dillane as Lieutenant Ian "Hunter" St. John
 Mark Powley as Lieutenant Adam "Bishop" Polanski
 David Fahm as Lieutenant Joseph "Knight" Khumalo
 Mark Hamill as The voice of Merlin (uncredited; credited as "?")
 Simon MacCorkindale as Flight Boss
 Craig Kelly as Radar Man Falk
 Fraser James as Helmsman
 Kieron Phipps as Peterson
 Chris Roberts as Lieutenant Roberts, Rescue and Recovery Pilot (uncredited)

Production
In late 1997 Digital Anvil, the entertainment company founded by Wing Commander creator Chris Roberts, acquired the live action feature film rights to the Wing Commander series from Electronic Arts.

Freddie Prinze Jr. later said, "I can't stand Wing Commander. I can't watch one scene of that movie... I read the script and loved it. So did my buddy Matthew Lillard. We both got the parts. We went on location and they said, 'Here's the new script'. It was a piece of crap."

Relations to other Wing Commander works
The film has been criticized by some fans for altering the visual style of the most recent Wing Commander games. The most notable shift between the games and the movie is the appearance of the Kilrathi. Although the movie's Kilrathi retain feline facial characteristics, they lose their signature fur entirely. Roberts has since said that this change was a result of his ongoing unhappiness with the appearance of the 'live' Kilrathi, none of which lived up to his internal vision. He had previously re-imagined the Kilrathi between Wing Commander III and IV, going so far as to completely redesign the Melek character between the two games. Roberts, even after production of the film, was left unsatisfied with the results of the film version of the Kilrathi; some interviews imply that the puppets were built before the sets were completed, and were too large to be filmed without hunching over unnaturally.

Several changes in character backgrounds and nationalities were also made, as well as plot and name changes. The 'pilgrim' story is new to the film, although there is some resemblance to the borderworlders of Wing Commander IV. The carrier's name was changed to Tiger Claw, rather than Tiger's Claw. The visual appearance of the ships also changed radically; the Rapier fighters featured in the film were built from scrapped English Electric Lightning jet fighter fuselages.

Roberts cast actors that bore little physical resemblance to those who previously held the part. Paladin went from being a thin fair-haired man in Wing Commander I & II (voiced by Martin Davies) to being a large dark-haired Scotsman in Wing Commander III and IV (played by John Rhys-Davies) to having a French accent in the movie (played by Karyo).Wing Commander Arena, the latest game in the series, makes reference to the movie, including references to the Pilgrim War, while using ships and settings which first appeared in the main series of games. The manual Star*Soldier does make references to some of the ships from the movie however showing them in silhouettes.

Reception
Critical reaction to Wing Commander'' was negative.   Audiences polled by CinemaScore gave the film an average grade of "D" on an A+ to F scale.

Novelization
The novelization of the film by Peter Telep was fairly faithful to the film, but in the book the plot to discredit Blair is more far-reaching and includes David Suchet's character, Captain Jason Sansky. There is also more general information about the Kilrathi and their first attack on a space station. The novel is based on the film's shooting script, which includes most of this information. Significant cuts removed the 'traitor' subplot from the finished film, since it heavily involved the unimpressive Kilrathi puppets. Admiral Bill Wilson was to be the traitor that compromised the Pegasus station (there were a number of scenes between Wilson and Bokoth, the commander of the Kilrathi battle group). In addition, Wilson provoked a knife fight on board the Kilrathi ConCom between Blair and Commander Gerald. Gerald wounded Blair, but everyone came to their senses and Blair used his Pilgrim Cross knife to kill Admiral Wilson (the only surviving element of this in the film is that Blair has a bandage on his hand during the scene where Paladin gave Blair his Pilgrim Cross). Also, Sansky was to commit suicide rather than be captured as a traitor; since all of his 'traitor' scenes were removed, the film now implies that Sansky died from head injuries he received during battle.

See also
 List of films based on video games

Notes and references

External links 
 
 
 
 

1999 films
1990s science fiction action films
20th Century Fox films
American science fiction action films
American science fiction war films
American space adventure films
British science fiction films
1990s English-language films
Films directed by Chris Roberts
Films scored by Kevin Kiner
Films scored by David Arnold
Films set in the 27th century
1990s science fiction war films
Live-action films based on video games
Wing Commander (franchise)
1999 directorial debut films
1990s American films
1990s British films